Streptomyces tuirus is a bacterium species from the genus of Streptomyces which has been isolated from soil. Streptomyces tuirus produces tuoromycin.

See also 
 List of Streptomyces species

References

Further reading

External links
Type strain of Streptomyces tuirus at BacDive -  the Bacterial Diversity Metadatabase	

tuirus
Bacteria described in 1963